The Packington Estate is a large council estate in Islington, London.

The Estate was built in the 1960s by Islington Council. In 2006, it was transferred to the Hyde Group, a housing association. The lead contractor for the redevelopment was Rydon, with a £130 million contract over eight years, replacing 538 structurally defective flats with 791 mixed-tenure houses and flats.

In November 2016, a new park on the Regent's Canal was opened called Canalside Square.

References

Housing estates in the London Borough of Islington